Berzelius is a lunar impact crater located in the northeast part of the Moon's near side. It lies to the southeast of the crater Franklin, and to the northwest of Geminus.

Berzelius is a low, eroded formation with a fairly level interior floor and a small, ridge-like rim. There are several tiny craterlets along the rim, and the wall is nearly gone along the southern side – it consists of little more than a low, wide ridge. The interior floor is marked by a few tiny craterlets.

Satellite craters
By convention these features are identified on lunar maps by placing the letter on the side of the crater midpoint that is closest to Berzelius.

References

 
 
 
 
 
 
 
 
 
 
 
 

Impact craters on the Moon